Aurania Rouverol (née Ellerbeck; August 13, 1886 – June 23, 1955) was an American writer best known for her play Skidding, in which she created Andy Hardy and his family, who were turned into a popular series of sixteen movies from Metro-Goldwyn-Mayer.

Biography
Aurania Ellerbeck was born, the 22nd baby, in Utah to Thomas Witten Ellerbeck, one of the chief clerks of Brigham Young. She went to Stanford University and studied playwriting at Radcliffe. She worked as an actress on stage.

She died in Palo Alto, California, aged 68 years.

She married Joseph Augustas Rouverol (Rouveyrol) in 1946 and was the mother of actress and author Jean Rouverol (1916–2017).

Select writings
Skidding (1928) – play
It Never Rains (1929) – play
Dance, Fools, Dance (1931) – film, dialogue
Growing Pains (1933) – play
All in Marriage (1935) – play
Places Please! (1937) – play

References

External links
 
 

American women dramatists and playwrights
1886 births
1955 deaths
People from Utah
20th-century American dramatists and playwrights
20th-century American women writers